The following lists events that happened during 1973 in Cape Verde.

Incumbents
Colonial governor: António Adriano Faria Lopes dos Santos

Events
March: The only legislative assembly election took place

Sports
GS Castilho won the Cape Verdean Football Championship

Births
July 20: Tcheka (Manuel Lopes Andrade), singer
November 13: Paulo dos Santos, footballer

References

 
1973 in the Portuguese Empire
Years of the 20th century in Cape Verde
1970s in Cape Verde
Cape Verde
Cape Verde